John Craig or Craige may refer to:

Religion
John Craig (reformer) (c. 1512–1600), Scottish minister and ancestor of Reverend John Craig, (1709–1774)
John Craig (priest) (1805–77), English clergyman responsible for All Saints Leamington Spa and the Craig telescope
John Duncan Craig (1831–1909), Irish poet, writer and Church of Ireland clergyman

Sciences
John Craig (physician) (died 1620), Scottish physician
John Craig (mathematician) (1663–1731), Scottish mathematician
John Craig (geologist) (1796–1880), Scottish geologist and lexicographer

Military
John Manson Craig (1896–1970), Scottish recipient of the Victoria Cross
John R. Craig (1906–1943), officer in the United States Navy

Politics
John Craig (Ontario MPP) (1843–1898), newspaper publisher and politician in Ontario, Canada
John B. Craig (born 1945), American diplomat
John Alexander Craig (1880–1968), political figure in Ontario

Business
John D. Craig (1903–1997), American businessman, entertainer, and deep-sea diver
 John Craig, a retail chain in South Africa

Sports
 John Craig (rugby union) (1918–1976), Scotland international rugby union player
 John Craige (wrestler) (1886–1954), American, competed at the 1908 Summer Olympics

Others
John Craig (classicist) (1887–1968), Scottish classicist, professor at the University of Sheffield
John C. Craig, architect in Salt Lake City, Utah
John Craig (economist), British economist
Johnny Craig (1926–2001), American comic book artist
John Craig (fictional agent), character in a series of spy thrillers by author James Munro

See also
Jon Craig (born 1957), chief political correspondent of Sky News
Jon Craig (architect) (c. 1941–2015), New Zealand architect
Jonathan Craig, Northern Irish Unionist politician
Johnny Craig (1926–2001), American comic book artist 
Jonny Craig (born 1986), Canadian-American singer/songwriter